This page includes the achievements, nominations and awards of the band Earth, Wind, & Fire.

Earth, Wind & Fire is an American R&B band formed in Chicago, Illinois, in 1969 and led by founder Maurice White.  Also known as EWF or the Elements of the Universe, the band has won seven Grammy Awards and four American Music Awards. They have been inducted into the Rock and Roll Hall of Fame and the Vocal Group Hall of Fame. They have sold over 90 million albums worldwide earning them a place on the list of best-selling music artists where they are ranked as the seventh best selling American band of all time. Rolling Stone has described Earth, Wind & Fire as "innovative, precise yet sensual, calculated yet galvanizing" and has also declared that the band "changed the sound of black pop".  Earth, Wind & Fire were also ranked at number 60 on VH1's list of the 100 Greatest Artists of Rock & Roll.

The band's music contains elements of African music, Latin music, funk, disco, soul, jazz, pop, rock, and other genres. The band is known for the dynamic sound of their horn section and the interplay between the contrasting vocals of Philip Bailey's falsetto and Maurice White's tenor. The kalimba (African thumb piano) is played on all of the band's albums.

American Music Awards
The American Music Awards is an annual awards ceremony created by Dick Clark in 1973. Earth, Wind, & Fire  has won four awards from twelve nominations.

|-
|rowspan="3"|1975
|rowspan="2"|Earth, Wind, & Fire
|Favorite Soul, R&B Band, Duo or Group
|
|-
|Favorite Pop, Rock Band, Duo or Group
|
|-
|That's The Way Of The World
|Favorite Soul/R&B Album
|
|-
|rowspan="4"|1976
|rowspan="2"|Earth, Wind, & Fire
|Favorite Soul, R&B Band, Duo or Group
|
|-
|Favorite Pop, Rock Band, Duo or Group
|
|-
|That's The Way Of The World
|Favorite Soul/R&B Album
|
|-
|Spirit
|Favorite Soul/R&B Album
|
|-
|rowspan="1"|1977
|Earth, Wind, & Fire
|Favorite Soul, R&B Band, Duo or Group
|
|-
|rowspan="2"|1978
|rowspan="1"|Earth, Wind, & Fire
|Favorite Soul, R&B Band, Duo or Group
|
|-
|All 'N All
|Favorite Soul/R&B Album
|
|-
|rowspan="1"|1979
|Earth, Wind, & Fire
|Favorite Soul, R&B Band, Duo or Group
|
|-
|rowspan="1"|1980
|Earth, Wind, & Fire
|Favorite Soul, R&B Band, Duo or Group
|

BET Awards
The BET Awards were established in 2001 by the Black Entertainment Television network to celebrate African Americans and other minorities in music, acting, sports, and other fields of entertainment over the past year. On June 25, 2002 Earth, Wind & Fire received the BET Lifetime Achievement Award.

|-
|2002
|Earth, Wind & Fire
|Lifetime Achievement Award
|
|}

Grammy Awards
The Grammy Awards are awarded annually by the National Academy of Recording Arts and Sciences of the United States. Earth, Wind, & Fire has received 7 awards from 17 nominations. In 2016 they were the recipients of the Grammy Lifetime Achievement Award.

|-
|rowspan="1"|1975
|rowspan="1"|"Shining Star"
|Best R&B Performance by a Duo or Group with Vocals
|
|-
|rowspan="2"|1976
|rowspan="1"|Gratitude
|Best R&B Performance by a Duo or Group with Vocals
|
|-
|rowspan="1"|"Can't Hide Love"
|Best Instrumental Arrangement Accompanying Vocalist(s
|
|-
|rowspan="3"|1978
|rowspan="1"|All 'N All
|Best R&B Performance by a Duo or Group with Vocals
|
|-
|rowspan="1"|"Got to Get You into My Life"
|Best Pop Performance by a Duo or Group with Vocals
|
|-
|rowspan="1"|"Runnin'"
|Best R&B Instrumental Performance
|
|-
|rowspan="4"|1979
|rowspan="2"|"Boogie Wonderland"
|Best Disco Recording
|
|-
|Best R&B Instrumental Performance|Best R&B Instrumental Performance
|
|-
|rowspan="2"|"After the Love Has Gone"
|Best R&B Performance by a Duo or Group with Vocals
|
|-
|Record of the Year
|
|-
|rowspan="1"|1981
|rowspan="1|Let's Groove"
|Best R&B Performance by a Duo or Group with Vocals
|
|-
|rowspan="1"|1982
|rowspan="1|"Wanna Be With You"
|Best R&B Performance by a Duo or Group with Vocals
|
|-
|rowspan="1"|1983
|rowspan="1"|"Fall in Love with Me"
|Best R&B Performance by a Duo or Group with Vocals
|
|-
|rowspan="1"|1993
|rowspan="1"|"Sunday Morning"
|Best R&B Performance by a Duo or Group with Vocals
|
|-
|rowspan="1"|2003
|rowspan="1"|"Hold Me"
|Best Traditional R&B Vocal Performance
|
|-
|rowspan="1"|2004
|rowspan="1"| "Show Me the Way" feat. Raphael Saadiq
|Best R&B Performance by a Duo or Group with Vocals
|
|-
|rowspan="1"|2005
|rowspan="1"|Illumination
|Best R&B Album
|
|-
|rowspan="1"|2016
|rowspan="1"|Earth, Wind & Fire
|Grammy Lifetime Achievement Award
|
|}

Hollywood Walk of Fame
The Hollywood Walk of Fame is a sidewalk along Hollywood Boulevard and Vine Street in Hollywood, California, with more than 2,000 five-pointed stars to honor artists for their achievement in the entertainment industry. Earth, Wind & Fire received a star on September 14, 1995. It is located at 7080 Hollywood Blvd.

|-
|1995
|Earth, Wind & Fire
|Recipient
|
|}

NAACP Image Award
An NAACP Image Award is an accolade presented by the American National Association for the Advancement of Colored People to honor outstanding people of color in film, television, music, and literature. Earth, Wind & Fire has received 2 nominations. In 1994 they received the Hall of Fame Award.

|-
|1988
|Earth, Wind & Fire
|Best Vocal Group
|
|-
|1994
|Earth, Wind & Fire
|Hall of Fame Award
|
|-
|rowspan="|2006
|rowspan="1"|Earth, Wind & Fire
| Outstanding Duo or Group
|
|}

Rock and Roll Hall of Fame
The Rock and Roll Hall of Fame is a museum located on the shores of Lake Erie in downtown Cleveland, Ohio, United States, dedicated to the recording history of some of the best-known and most influential artists, producers, and other people who have influenced the music industry. On March 6, 2000 Earth, Wind & Fire was inducted into the Rock and Roll Hall Of Fame.

|-
|2000
|Earth, Wind & Fire
|Inducted
|
|}

Songwriter's Hall of Fame
Earth, Wind & Fire's Maurice White, Phillip Bailey, Verdine White, Al McKay and Larry Dunn were inducted on June 17, 2010.

|-
|2010
|Earth, Wind & Fire
|Inducted
|
|}

Soul Train Music Awards
The Soul Train Music Awards is an annual award show which previously aired in national television syndication, and honors the best in Black music and entertainment. Earth, Wind & Fire has received a sum of 4 nominations. During 2011 they were bestowed with the Soul Train Legend Award.

|-
|rowspan="1|1988
|rowspan="1"|Touch the World
|Album of the Year - Group or Band
|
|-
|rowspan="1|1988
|rowspan="|System of Survival
|Best Single, Group or Band
|
|-
|rowspan="|1994
|rowspan="1"|Millennium
|R&B Album of the Year, by Group, Band or Duo
|
|-
|rowspan="|2006
|rowspan="1"|Illumination
|R&B Album of the Year, by Group, Band or Duo
|
|-
|rowspan="|2011
|rowspan="1"|Earth, Wind & Fire
|Legend Award
|
|}

Vocal Group Hall of Fame
During 2003 Earth, Wind & Fire was inducted into the Vocal Group Hall of Fame.

|-
|rowspan="|2003
|rowspan="1"|Earth, Wind & Fire
|Inducted
|
|}

Other awards
First black performers to receive the Madison Square Garden Gold Ticket Award for selling more than 100,000 tickets.
First black performers to receive the Columbia Records Crystal Globe Award for selling more than five million albums in foreign markets.
On  Monday, June 17, 2002 Earth Wind & Fire received the ASCAP Rhythm & Soul Heritage Award.
Earth, Wind & Fire were inducted into Hollywood's RockWalk on Monday, July 7, 2003
On Tuesday June 8, 2004 Earth, Wind & Fire received the National Academy of Recording Arts and Sciences  Signature Governor's Award by the Los Angeles chapter of the Academy. 
During 2004 as an album "That's the Way of the World" was inducted into the Grammy Hall of Fame
In 2007 "Shining Star" was inducted into the Grammy Hall Of Fame
On May 10, 2008 Maurice White and Philip Bailey received honorary doctorates from the Berklee College of Music.
On May 18, 2008 Maurice White, Ralph Johnson, Philip Bailey and Verdine White each received an honorary degree from the Arts and Media College at Columbia College Chicago during the college's 2008 commencement exercises.
In 2009 Earth, Wind & Fire won the Entertainer Award at the 2009 TV Land Awards and the Daniel L. Stephenson Humanitarian Award for Lifetime Achievement in Music at the 15th Temecula Valley International Film Festival.
In 2012 Earth, Wind & Fire were the recipients of the Lifetime Achievement Award at the Trumpet Awards.
In 2012 Earth, Wind & Fire received Major League Baseball's Beacon of Change award at the Beacon Awards Banquet.
In 2019 the single "September" was selected by the Library of Congress for preservation in the National Recording Registry for being "culturally, historically, or aesthetically significant".
 Earth, Wind & Fire were included with Sesame Street, Sally Field, Michael Tilson Thomas, and Linda Ronstadt among the 42nd Annual Kennedy Center Honors in December 2019.

References

Awards
Lists of awards received by American musician
Lists of awards received by musical group